Hesar-e Hajji Esmail (also Romanized as Ḩeşār-e Ḩājjī Esmāʿīl; also known as Ḩeşār) is a village in Kabud Gonbad Rural District, in the Central District of Kalat County, Razavi Khorasan Province, Iran. At the 2006 census, its population was 157, in 42 families.

References 

Populated places in Kalat County